

Geoff Brabham (born 20 March 1952) is an Australian racing driver. Brabham spent the majority of his racing career in the United States.

Racing career

CART
He raced successfully in CART early in his career, finishing 8th in 1982, 1984 and 1987 with nine podiums. In ten appearances in the Indianapolis 500, he had a best result of fourth in 1983 and fifth in 1981.

Sports car racing
His greatest source of success was in various forms of sports cars, winning four IMSA GTP titles (1988–1991) when racing for Nissan, and one Can-Am championship (1981).

Brabham also won the 1993 24 Hours of Le Mans driving one of the factory Peugeot 905 alongside French drivers Éric Hélary and Christophe Bouchut. His younger brother David Brabham had won the GT class in the race driving a Jaguar XJ220 for Tom Walkinshaw Racing, but the team was later disqualified for technical infringements. Geoff Brabham became just the third Australian driver to win Le Mans after Bernard Rubin (1928) and Vern Schuppan in 1983. David Brabham would also go on to win Le Mans in 2009, also driving for the factory Peugeot team.

Touring car racing
Later in his career, Brabham returned to Australia, where he was runner-up in the 1995 and 1997 Australian Super Touring Championship, and won the 1997 Bathurst 1000 Super Touring race driving a BMW 320i alongside brother David. The pair initially finished second behind BMW Motorsport Australia teammates Paul Morris and Craig Baird, but a blunder by the team left Baird in his car at the final pit stop which meant that by the end of the race, the Kiwi driver had breached the race regulation which limited any one driver to a maximum of three hours continuous driving. This caused their disqualification and handed the win to the Brabham brothers.

Brabham dabbled in V8 Supercar drives in his native Australia throughout his career. He is still one of the few drivers to win his first race, Sandown 500 in 1993. He started eleven races for one victory.

Stock car racing
Brabham took two race victories in the International Race of Champions stock car series (1992 and 1993), both at Michigan. He made his only NASCAR Winston Cup Series start at the first ever Brickyard 400 at Indianapolis in 1994, driving for Michael Kranefuss. Brabham crashed in the second half of the race.

Personal life
He is the son of three-time Formula One World Champion Jack Brabham. He has two younger brothers; Gary and David. Geoff teamed with David to win the 1997 Bathurst 1000 in a BMW, becoming the only brothers to have combined to win the race. Although the most successful of the second generation of racing Brabhams, unlike his siblings he did not compete in World Championship Formula One.

Married to Roseina Brabham, a multi-time jet-ski champion, Brabham has retired from competition himself to focus on his son Matthew's racing career. After a successful karting career, Matthew moved into international open-wheel racing and the Road to Indy ladder; he is also a two-time Stadium Super Trucks champion.

Awards
He was inducted in the Motorsports Hall of Fame of America in 2004. In 2014, Brabham was assigned as the chief director of Nissan and its developer Nismo.

Racing career

American Open-Wheel racing results

Complete USAC Mini-Indy Series results

Complete USAC Championship Car results

CART
(key) (Races in bold indicate pole position)

Indianapolis 500

Touring/Sports Cars

Complete 24 Hours of Le Mans results

V8 Supercar results

Complete Bathurst 1000 results

* Super Touring race

Sandown 500 results

References 

 Driver Database stats
 Conrod Profile - V8 Supercar stats.
 Racing Reference - US Stats
 CART/USAC Results

1952 births
24 Hours of Le Mans drivers
24 Hours of Le Mans winning drivers
Atlantic Championship drivers
Australian expatriate sportspeople in the United States
Australian Formula 2 drivers
Bathurst 1000 winners
Geoff
Champ Car drivers
Indianapolis 500 drivers
International Race of Champions drivers
SCCA Formula Super Vee drivers
Formula Super Vee Champions
Living people
NASCAR drivers
Racing drivers from Sydney
Australian IndyCar Series drivers
Sportsmen from New South Wales
Supercars Championship drivers
World Sportscar Championship drivers
Australian Formula One drivers
British Formula One Championship drivers
12 Hours of Sebring drivers
Team Penske drivers
Peugeot Sport drivers
Nismo drivers
BMW M drivers